The 2016 Army Black Knights football team represented the United States Military Academy as an independent in the 2016 NCAA Division I FBS football season. The Black Knights were led by third-year head coach Jeff Monken and played their home games at Michie Stadium. They finished the season 8–5 and defeated Navy for the first time since 2001 in the Army–Navy Game. They were invited to the Heart of Dallas Bowl where they defeated North Texas in overtime.

Schedule

Personnel

Roster

Depth chart

Depth Chart 2016
True Freshman
Double Position : *

Game summaries

at Temple

Rice

at UTEP

at Buffalo

at Duke

Lafayette

North Texas

at Wake Forest

Air Force

vs. Notre Dame

Morgan State

vs. Navy

vs. North Texas – Heart of Dallas Bowl

References

Army
Army Black Knights football seasons
First Responder Bowl champion seasons
Army Black Knights football